The International Crop Information System (ICIS) was an open-source database system led by researchers from the International Rice Research Institute (IRRI) that provided integrated management of global information on crop improvement and management both for individual crops and for farming systems. 

The project was motivated by ambiguous germplasm identification, difficulty in tracing pedigree information, and lack of integration between genetic resources, breeding, evaluation, utilization, and management data, all of which constrained the development of more knowledge-intensive crop research efforts.

In conjunction with the IRRI, the ICIS was developed by agricultural scientists and information technicians in several centers of the Consultative Group for International Agricultural Research (CGIAR), in Advanced Research Institutions (ARIs), and in National Agricultural Research Systems (NARSs) to address these constraints.

The project was discontinued in 2011.

Implementations
The rice implementation of the ICIS was referred to as the "International Rice Information System", or "IRIS". There were other implementations for other crops, including a wheat implementation known as "IWIS", one for lentils known as "ILIS", chickpeas "IChIS", faba bean "IFIS", and more.

References

ICIS-specific references
Bruskiewich R, Cosico A, Eusebio W, Portugal A, Ramos LR, Reyes T, Sallan MAB, Ulat VJM, Wang X, McNally KL, Sackville Hamilton R and McLaren CG. "Linking Genotype To Phenotype: The International Rice Information System (IRIS)." 2003. Bioinformatics 19(Suppl.1):i63-i65
Fox, PN. and Skovmand, B. (1996). "The International Crop Information System (ICIS) - connects genebank to breeder to farmer’s field." Plant adaptation and crop improvement (eds. M. Cooper and G.L. Hammer), CAB International. pp 317–326.
McLaren, CG; Bruskiewich, RM; Portugal, AM; Cosico, AB. 2005. "The International Rice Information System. a platform for meta-analysis of rice crop data." Plant Physio. 139 (2): 637-642
Portugal, Arllet; Balachandra, Ranjan; Metz, Thomas; Bruskiewich, Richard and McLaren, Graham; "International Crop Information System for Germplasm Data Management." 2007, Plant Bioinformatics: Methods and Protocols. Dave Edwards, Editor. Methods Mol Biol.406:459-72 Humana Press. Totowa, New Jersey, USA

Related project references
Bruskiewich, Richard et al 2008 "The Generation Challenge Programme Platform: Semantic Standards and Workbench for Crop Science", International Journal of Plant Genomics, vol. 2008, Article ID 369601, 6 pages. 
Bruskiewich, Richard et al 2006. The Generation Challenge Programme (GCP)-Standards for Crop Data. OMICS 10(2):215-219
Bruskiewich R, Metz T and McLaren G. 2006. Bioinformatics and crop information systems in rice research. IRRN 31(1):5-12

External links 
 International Crop Information System web site

Agricultural research